The Macintosh 512K is a personal computer that was designed, manufactured and sold by Apple Computer from September 1984 to April 1986. It is the first update to the original Macintosh 128K. It was virtually identical to the previous Macintosh, differing primarily in the amount of built-in random-access memory.  The increased memory turned the Macintosh into a more business-capable computer and gained the ability to run more software. It is the earliest Macintosh model that can be used as an AppleShare server and, with a bridge Mac, communicate with modern devices.

The Mac 512K originally shipped with Macintosh System 1.1 but was able to run all versions of Mac OS up to System 4.1.  It was replaced by the Macintosh 512Ke and the Macintosh Plus. All support for the Mac 512K was discontinued on September 1, 1998.

Features

Processor and memory
Like the Macintosh 128K before it, the 512K contained a  Motorola 68000 connected to 512 KB of DRAM by a 16-bit data bus. Though the memory had been quadrupled, it could not be upgraded. The large increase earned it the nickname Fat Mac. A 64 KB ROM chip boosts the effective memory to 576 KB, but this is offset by the display's 22 KB framebuffer, which is shared with the DMA video controller. This shared arrangement reduces CPU performance by up to 35%. It shared a revised logic board with the rebadged Macintosh 128K (previously just called the Macintosh), which streamlined manufacturing. The resolution of the display was the same, at 512 × 342.

Apple sold a memory upgrade for the Macintosh 128K for $995 initially, and reduced the price when 256 kb DRAM prices fell months later.

Software
The applications MacPaint and MacWrite were still bundled with the Mac. Soon after this model was released, several other applications became available, including MacDraw, MacProject, Macintosh Pascal and others. In particular, Microsoft Excel, which was written specifically for the Macintosh, required a minimum of 512 KB of RAM, but solidified the Macintosh as a serious business computer. Models with the enhanced ROM also supported Apple's Switcher, allowing cooperative multitasking among (necessarily few) applications.

New uses
The LaserWriter printer became available shortly after the 512K's introduction, as well as the number pad, mic, tablet, keyboard, mouse, basic mouse, and much more. It utilized Apple's built-in networking scheme LocalTalk which allows sharing of devices among several users. The 512K was the oldest Macintosh capable of supporting Apple's AppleShare built-in file sharing network, when introduced in 1987. The expanded memory in the 512K allowed it to better handle large word-processing documents and make better use of the graphical user interface and generally increased speed over the 128K model.

Color Systems Technology used an army of 512K units connected to a custom Intel 80186-based machine to colorize numerous black-and-white films in the mid-1980s.

System software
The original 512K could accept Macintosh system software up to version 4.1; System Software 5 was possible if used with the Hard Disk 20.

Upgrades

An updated version replaced the Macintosh 512K and debuted as the Macintosh 512K enhanced in April 1986. It differed from the original 512K in that it had an 800 KB floppy disk drive and the same improved ROM as the Macintosh Plus. With the exception of the new model number (M0001E), they were otherwise cosmetically identical. The stock 512K could also use an 800 KB floppy disk drive as well as the Hard Disk 20, the first hard disk manufactured by Apple exclusively for use with the 512K, but required a special system file (not required by the 512Ke) that loaded the improved  ROM code into RAM, thus reducing the RAM available for other uses. Apple offered an upgrade kit which replaced the floppy disk drive and ROMs, essentially turning it into a 512Ke. One further OEM upgrade replaced the logic board and the rear case entirely with that of the Macintosh Plus.

As with the original Macintosh, the 512K was designed with no slots for upgrade boards and had no hard-disk controller, so the few internal upgrades that were available for the 512K, such as General Computer's US$2,795 Hyperdrive hard drive, had to plug directly into the 68000 processor socket. Other such upgrades included "snap-on" SCSI cards and RAM upgrades of 2 MB or more.

Timeline

See also
Macintosh 128K/512K technical details

References

External links

Macintosh 512K technical specifications at apple.com
Inside the Macintosh 512K

512k
512k
Computer-related introductions in 1984